Ikechi is a Nigerian masculine given name that may refer to
Ikechi Anya (born 1988), Scottish football midfielder
Ikechi Ariguzo (born 1992), American football linebacker
Ikechi Nwosu, Anglican bishop in Nigeria
Ikechi Uko (born 1964), Nigerian travel consultant and journalist